Doom is another name for damnation.

Doom may also refer to:

People 
 Doom (professional wrestling), the tag team of Ron Simmons and Butch Reed
 Daniel Doom (born 1934), Belgian cyclist
 Debbie Doom (born 1963), American softball pitcher
 Lorna Doom, the bassist for American punk-rock band Germs
 MF Doom (1971–2020), hip-hop musician and producer
 Omar Doom (born 1976), American actor, musician and artist
 Alexander Doom (born 1997), Belgian sprinter

Geographical features 
 Doom Island, in Sorong, West Papua, Indonesia
 Doom Mons, a mountain range and peak on Titan, Saturn's moon
 Doom Mountain, on Vancouver Island, British Columbia, Canada

Arts, entertainment, and media

Entertainment franchise
 Doom (franchise), a series of first-person shooter video games and spin-off media, created by id Software
 Doom (1993 video game), the first installment
 Doom (2016 video game), the fourth installment
 Doom engine, which powers Doom games and others
 Doom (film), a 2005 film loosely based on the Doom 3 (2004 video game)
 Doom (novel series), a series of books based on the first two video games, by Dafydd ab Hugh and Brad Linaweaver
 Doom: Annihilation, a 2019 film based on the 1993 game
 Doom: The Boardgame, a board game adaptation of the video games

Films 
 The Doom, a 1976 Romanian film by Sergiu Nicolaescu
 Doom (film), a 2005 film loosely based on the Doom 3 (2004 video game)
 Justice League: Doom, a 2011 animated film from DC Entertainment

Fictional entities 
 Doctor Doom, a Marvel Comics character
 Cynthia Von Doom, a Marvel Comics character - mother of the character Doctor Doom
 Judge Doom, a character from the 1988 film, Who Framed Roger Rabbit
 Mount Doom, a fictional volcano in J.R.R. Tolkien's The Lord of the Rings
 Thulsa Doom, a character from Robert E. Howard's Conan the Barbarian
 Valeria Von Doom, a Marvel Comics character

Music 

 Doom (album), a 1997 hip-hop album by Mood
 Doom (British band), a hardcore punk band
 Doom (EP), a 2005 death metal EP by Job for a Cowboy
 Doom (Japanese band), a heavy metal band
 Doom metal, a style of heavy metal music

Other uses in arts, entertainment, and media
 Doom paintings, a traditional painting that depicts the Last Judgment
 DOOM Inc, an American film production company
 Doom (book), a 2021 book by Niall Ferguson

See also 

 Dhoom (disambiguation)
 "Doom and Gloom"
 Doomed (disambiguation)
 Doomsday (disambiguation)
 Dr. Doom (disambiguation)
 Legion of Doom (disambiguation)